Congost is a Spanish surname of Catalan origin. Notable people with the surname include:

Carles Congost (born 1970), Spanish visual artist
Elena Congost Mohedano (born 1987), Spanish visually impaired runner

Catalan-language surnames